The Hoima–Kampala Petroleum Products Pipeline (HKPPP) is a proposed pipeline to transport refined oil products from the Uganda Oil Refinery in Hoima to a distribution terminal near Buloba in Wakiso District, approximately , by road, west of Kampala's central business district.

Location
The pipeline will begin at the Uganda Oil Refinery at Kabaale Township, Buseruka Sub-county, Hoima District, Western Uganda near the international border with the Democratic Republic of the Congo. The pipeline will end at an oil products distribution terminal to be constructed in the neighborhood of Buloba along the Kampala–Mityana Road.

Background
The pipeline will transport various products, including jet fuel, gasoline, kerosene, and diesel fuel. From Buloba, the products will be distributed by truck to various locations in Uganda. Buloba will also be the point of sale to the international market of any excess petroleum products. The Kenya–Uganda–Rwanda Petroleum Products Pipeline will interface with this pipeline at Buloba to ease transfer of product between the two pipelines when needed.

Construction
, the government of Uganda was evaluating bids by several international firms to determine which had the best plan to construct the pipeline. The selected firm will "conduct a baseline environmental study for the project and generate a blueprint for the pipeline’s route". Another company, yet to be selected, will be hired to implement the resettlement plan for the people who will displaced by the pipeline. All the companies under consideration are from outside Africa, although their names have not been disclosed.

In July 2015, the Ugandan government selected Ramboll Group A/S, a Danish consulting engineering company to conduct a detailed route and environmental study for an oil products pipeline that will run from Hoima to Buloba. The  pipeline will be accompanied by information and communication technology cables, a dual-carriage highway, and power transmission lines between Hoima and Kampala, all contained in a  "utility corridor". Ramboll's report is expected in about one year.

Ownership
In April 2018, Proscovia Nabbanja, the chief operating officer of Uganda National Oil Company (UNOC), revealed that UNOC will own 51 percent of the Buloba terminal, JK Minerals Africa (South Africa) shall own 20 percent and a strategic partner, yet to be identified, will own 29 percent. The cost of building the fuel products terminal is budgeted at US$51.7 million (USh194 billion), to which UNOC will contribute US$10.5 million (USh39.4 billion), in equity.

See also

 Uganda National Oil Company
 Petroleum Authority of Uganda

References

External links
Uganda, Tanzania discuss oil pipeline
Shs14.7 Billion (US$6.2 Million) Allocated Towards In-Country Refinery In 2011
 Uganda’s oil still competitive despite global oil price plunge

Proposed energy infrastructure in Africa
Oil pipelines in Uganda
Companies based in Kampala